The Canton of Perpignan-6 is a French canton of Pyrénées-Orientales department, in Occitanie.

Composition

At the French canton reorganisation which came into effect in March 2015, the canton was expanded from 1 to 2 communes:
Perpignan (western part)
Toulouges

Before 2015, the canton included only the following neighbourhoods of Perpignan:
 West downtown
 Les Remparts
 Saint-Mathieu/La Réal
 Clémenceau

References 

Perpignan 6